Truhlar is a surname. Notable people with the surname include:

Donald Truhlar (born 1944), American scientist
Vladimir Truhlar (1912–1977), Slovenian theologian

Czech-language surnames
Occupational surnames